Gonocephalus doriae (Doria's angle-headed lizard) is a species of arboreal lizard in the family Agamidae. The species is endemic to the island of Borneo.

Etymology
G. doriae is named for Marquis Giacomo Doria (1840–1913), an Italian naturalist, botanist, herpetologist and politician, founder of the Museo Civico di Storia Naturale in Genoa (now the Natural History Museum of Giacomo Doria) and its director from then until his death.

Description
G. doriae is usually green on top with dark and light flecks and an indistinct wavy grey pattern, and sometimes with large orange patches. The dewlap/gular pouch is yellow with greyish-blue stripes. There is typically a series of transverse bars on the lower flanks and the ventral surface is lighter. There is a pronounced dorsal crest that is as high as the nuchal crest.

Geographic range
Doria's angle-headed lizard is found only in the lowland and hill rainforests of Indonesian Borneo and Malaysian Borneo.

Behavior
G. doriae is diurnal and is typically found perched on the side of a tree or sapling. At night, juveniles and young adults can be found sleeping on the tops of branches with their head pointed back towards the trunk. When threatened, it will often open its mouth, but is generally disinclined to bite.

Diet
The diet of Doria's angle-headed lizard is not recorded, but likely to be primarily arthropods.

Reproduction
G. doriae is oviparous. Little is known about clutch sizes.

Taxonomy
There is some dispute over whether Gonocephalus abbottii represents a full species or is actually a subspecies of G. doriae.

References

Further reading
Boulenger GA (1885). Catalogue of the Lizards in the British Museum (Natural History). Second Edition. Volume I. Geckonidæ, Eublepharidæ, Uroplatidæ, Pygopodidæ, Agamidæ. London: Trustees of the British Museum (Natural History). (Taylor and Francis, printers). xii + 436 pp. + Plates I-XXXII. (Gonyocephalus doriæ, pp. 284-285).
Cochran DM (1922). "Description of a new species of Agamid lizard from the Malay Peninsula". Proceedings of the United States National Museum 60: 1-3. (Gonocephalus abbotti, new species).
Cox MJ, van Dijk PP, Nabhitabhata J, Thirakhupt K (1998). A Photographic Guide to Snakes and other Reptiles of Peninsular Malaysia, Singapore and Thailand. Ralph Curtis Publishing. 144 pp. .
de Rooij N (1915). The Reptiles of the Indo-Australian Archipelago. I. Lacertilia, Chelonia, Emydosauria. Leiden: E.J. Brill. xiv + 384 pp.
Evers, Michael (2013). "Der Traum vom Urwald im Wohnzimmer. Winkelkopfagamen (Gonocephalus) im Terrarium ". Reptilia (Münster) 18 (102): 50-59. (in German).
Evers, Michael (2010). Winkelkopfagamen. Gonocephalus belli, G. chamaeleontinus, G. doriae abbotti. Münster: Natur und Tier Verlag. 64 pp. (in German).
Grismer LL, Chan KO, Grismer JL, Wood PL Jr, Norhayati A (2010). "A checklist of the herpetofauna of the Banjaran Bintang, peninsular Malaysia". Russian Journal of Herpetology 17 (2): 147-160.
Grossmann W, Tillack F (2004). "Gonocephalus doriae abbotti COCHRAN 1922 ". Sauria (Berlin) 26 (3): 2. (in German).
Manthey U, Denzer W (1993). "Die Echten Winkelkopfagamen der Gattung Gonocephalus KAUP (Sauria: Agamidae) VI. Die chamaeleontinus-Gruppe ". Sauria 15 (2): 23-38. (in German).
Manthey U, Grossmann W (1997). Amphibien & Reptilien Südostasiens. Münster: Natur und Tier Verlag. 512 pp. (in German).
Manthey U, Schuster N (1999). Agamen, 2. Aufl. Münster: Natur und Tier Verlag. 120 pp.
Peters W (1871). "Über neue Reptilien aus Ostafrika und Sarawak (Borneo), vorzüglich aus der Sammlung des Hrn. Marquis J. Doria zu Genua ". Monatsberichte der königlich preussischen Akadademie der Wissenschaften zu Berlin 1871: 566-581. (Gonyocephalus doriae, new species, p. 570). (in German).
Taylor EH (1963). "The lizards of Thailand". University of Kansas Science Bulletin 44: 687-1077.
Tweedie MWF (1954). "Notes on Malayan reptiles, No. 3". Bulletin of the Raffles Museum (25): 107-117.

Gonocephalus
Lizards of Asia
Endemic fauna of Borneo
Reptiles of Indonesia
Reptiles of Malaysia
Reptiles described in 1871
Taxa named by Wilhelm Peters
Reptiles of Borneo